Caherduff Castle is a tower house and National Monument located near Cong, Ireland.

Location

History
Caherduff Castle was acquired by the Irish state in 1918.

References

National Monuments in County Mayo
Castles in County Mayo